Edward Dawson (14 March 1802 – 1 June 1859) was an English Liberal Party politician.  He was a Member of Parliament (MP) for South Leicestershire from 1832 to 1835.

References

External links 
 

1802 births
1859 deaths
Liberal Party (UK) MPs for English constituencies
UK MPs 1832–1835